Svend Egil Benjamin Olsen (17 October 1908 – 13 December 1980) was a Danish light-heavyweight weightlifter who won a silver medal at the 1932 Olympics. The same year he set world records in the clean and jerk, snatch and in the total, but the last record was not ratified. Next year he retired from competitions and later worked as a circus performer.

References 

1908 births
1980 deaths
Danish male weightlifters
Olympic weightlifters of Denmark
Weightlifters at the 1932 Summer Olympics
Olympic silver medalists for Denmark
World record setters in weightlifting
Olympic medalists in weightlifting
Medalists at the 1932 Summer Olympics
People from Hundested
Sportspeople from the Capital Region of Denmark